The C.A.N approach to eating behavior proposes three strategies in consumer psychology that can help people make healthier food choices. The food must be convenient (C), attractive (A), and normal (N), or CAN.  The idea was researched and created by Brian Wansink, Director of the Cornell Food and Brand Lab, and others at Cornell University. Wansink has since resigned after 15 of his papers were retracted and he was found guilty of academic misconduct.  

A paper in Psychology and Marketing showed that when fruit is put in a nice bowl in your home on the counter, it becomes more convenient, attractive, and normal to grab a banana or orange, rather than chocolate ice cream hidden in the back of the freezer. Therefore, the CAN idea supposedly helps make healthier eating choices easier. The results of this study are intended to help consumers make healthier decisions by adjusting the way they select and serve their food. The authors suggest these organizational frameworks can be used to show how research can help transform consumer eating environments.

See also 
 Nudge theory, about influencing individuals' actions without force

References

Further reading
 Wansink, Brian (2013), "Convenient, Attractive, and Normative: The CAN Approach to Making Children Slim by Design, Childhood Obesity, 9:4 (August), 277-278.

Eating disorders
Psychological concepts
Cornell University
Psychological theories